Polton may refer to:

Polton, a village in Scotland
Polton (record label), a Polish record label
Thomas Polton (?-1433), a British bishop